The Chinese Ambassador to Libya is the official representative of the People's Republic of China to the State of Libya.

History 
From 1959 to September 14, 1978 the governments in Tripoli and Taipei maintained diplomatic relations.
Since August 9, 1978 the governments of Tripoli and Beijing maintain diplomatic relations.

List of representatives

References 

 
Libya
China